Maladaptive daydreaming, also called excessive daydreaming, is when an individual experiences excessive daydreaming that interferes with daily life. It is a proposed diagnosis of a disordered form of dissociative absorption associated with excessive fantasy that is not recognized by any major medical or psychological criteria. Maladaptive daydreaming can result in distress, can replace human interaction and may interfere with normal functioning such as social life or work.
 Maladaptive daydreaming is not a widely recognized diagnosis, and is not found in any major diagnostic manual of psychiatry or medicine. The term was coined in 2002 by Professor Eli Somer of University of Haifa. Somer's definition of the proposed condition is “extensive fantasy activity that replaces human interaction and/or interferes with academic, interpersonal, or vocational functioning.” There has been limited research outside of Somer's.

Range of daydreaming 
Daydreaming, a form of normal dissociation associated with absorption, is a highly prevalent mental activity experienced by almost everyone. Some individuals reportedly possess the ability to daydream so vividly that they experience a sense of presence in the imagined environment. This experience is reported to be extremely rewarding to the extent that some of those who experience it develop a compulsion to repeat it that it has been described as an addiction.

Somer has proposed "stimuli" for maladaptive daydreams that may relate to specific locations. The main proposed symptom is extremely vivid fantasies with "story-like features", such as the daydream's characters, plots and settings.

Somer has argued that maladaptive daydreaming is not a form of psychosis as people with maladaptive daydreaming can tell that their fantasies are not real while those with psychotic disorders have difficulty separating hallucinations or delusions from reality.

Online support 
Whilst maladaptive daydreaming is not a recognized psychiatric disorder, it has spawned online support groups since Somer first reported the proposed disorder in 2002.

Research 
Maladaptive daydreaming is currently studied by a consortium of researches (The International Consortium for Maladaptive Daydreaming Research or ICMDR) from diverse countries including USA, Poland, Switzerland, Israel, Greece, and Italy.

Interested researchers are continuously added to the Consortium, in order to foster collaborations in this small field of research. The ICMDR's website features all scientific studies on MD in the "publications" section.

Diagnosis 
There are no official ways to diagnose maladaptive daydreaming in patients because it has not yet been recognized in any official diagnostic manual for psychiatry, such as the DSM-5. However, some methods have been developed in attempt to gauge the proposed mental disorder's prevalence.

Maladaptive Daydreaming Scale (MDS-16) 
In 2015, a 14-item self-report measurement known as the Maladaptive Daydreaming Scale or MDS-16 was designed to identify abnormalities in the daydreaming of individuals. The purpose of designing this instrument was to provide a reliable and valid measurement of the existence of the proposed condition in patients, and to garner attention to the potential existence of maladaptive daydreaming as a mental disorder.

Later, an additional two items were added, assessing the use of music in fostering daydreaming. The MDS-16 has been used in several countries such as the United States, Turkey, the United Kingdom, Italy, and Israel.

Potential Comorbidity 
Maladaptive daydreaming has been identified to potentially have comorbidity with a number of already existing recognized mental disorder such as attention deficit hyperactivity disorder, anxiety disorder, major depressive disorder, and obsessive-compulsive disorder (OCD). In one case study, a patient believed to have the condition was administered fluvoxamine, a medication typically used to treat those with OCD. The patient found she was better able to control the frequency of her daydreaming episodes.

Maladaptive daydreaming in media 
Although maladaptive daydreaming has not been officially recognized as a mental disorder, it has garnered attention from numerous news and media outlets starting in 2020.

Reality shifting is a trend that appears to be a form of excessive daydreaming, which emerged as an internet phenomenon on TikTok around 2020.

See also 
 Avoidant personality disorder
 Dissociation (psychology)
 Fantasy prone personality
 Mind wandering
 Procrastination

References 

Symptoms and signs of mental disorders